Forevermore is a 2014 Philippine romantic drama television series directed by Cathy Garcia-Molina, starring Enrique Gil and Liza Soberano, together with an ensemble cast. The series aired on ABS-CBN's Primetime Bida evening block and worldwide on The Filipino Channel from October 27, 2014, to May 22, 2015, replacing Ikaw Lamang. and was replaced by Pangako sa 'Yo.

Plot 
This is the story of Alexander "Xander" Grande III (Enrique Gil), the rebellious, broken, only child of a hotel magnate, and Maria Agnes Calay (Liza Soberano), the humble, beautiful and hardworking daughter of a strawberry farmer in La Presa, Benguet. They cross paths when Xander crashes into Agnes' strawberry truck while BASE jumping. After the incident, his parents force him to pay for the damages by living and working at the strawberry farm without comfortable amenities, alongside Agnes and her strawberry farm community. Xander's immersion in a different world is not easy for both, but Agnes and the La Presa community transform him from an entitled broken boy into a very charming, understanding, and caring man. Xander and Agnes fall deeply in love with each other. Meanwhile, Xander has unfinished business with his first love, Kate Saavedra (Sofia Andres), who is struggling with their break up.  Xander and Agnes' love is further challenged when they get entangled in the strawberry farm land dispute between their families. A mature Xander makes the greatest sacrifice for Agnes, the woman he loves the most, and they part ways. As fate would have it, after two years of separation, they meet again.

Cast and characters

Main cast

Supporting cast

Extended cast
 Nonong "Bangkay" de Andres as Mang Banky
 Lilia Cuntapay as Aling Aunor
 Jesse James Ongteco as Niknok
 Marco Gumabao as JC
 CJ Navato as Dexter
 Bernadette Allyson-Estrada as Loulie Perez-Saavedra
 Joe Gruta as Ka Sebio
 Pepe Herrera as Cesar Bernales
 Karen Dematera as Karen Poe
 Raymond Osmena as Damian
 Igi Boy Flores as Momon
 Michael Flores as Congressman Jaime Saavedra

Guest cast
 Karen Reyes as Charlotte
 Devon Seron as Jasmine
 Elisse Joson as Roselle
 Hyubs Azarcon as Sir Biboy
 Kitkat as Shiela
 Erin Ocampo as Patricia Alexandra Decena
 Mymy Davao as Tanya
 Ricky Rivero as himself (TV Host for Top Bad Boy)
 Marina Benipayo as Stephanie "Steph" Montecillo–Camembert
 Rolando Inocencio as President of Rallos University
 Evelyn "Matutina" Guerrero as Aling Pasencia
 Gio Alvarez as Atty. Mateo "Teo" Salazar
 Jojo Alejar as Frank Martin
 Ana Capri as Tetay Fernandez
 Miguel Morales, Daniel Ombao and Renz Michael as Jay's best friends
 Anjo Damiles as Jonathan Acosta
 ChicoSci as themselves in La Presa Palooza
 Callalily as themselves in Battle of the Bands
 6cyclemind as themselves in Battle of the Bands
 Banda ni Kleggy as themselves in Battle of the Bands
 Dennis Padilla as Alex's father
 Myrtle Sarrosa as Jessica
 Mel Kimura as Venus
 Jasper Visaya as Jass
 Yayo Aguila as Taps
 Chase Vega as Hapon
 Luz Fernandez as Aling Galietta
 Gabriel Sumalde as Sebastian "Basty" Grande 
 John Wayne Sace as Kano
 Arnold Reyes as Tim
 Erich Gonzales as Alexandra "Alex" Pante
 Alfred Martin as young Alexander "Xander" Grande
 Rhed Bustamante as young Maria Agnes Calay

Episodes

Awards and nominations

International broadcasts
  Indonesia — MNCTV
  Kenya — StarTimes Novela E1
  Kazakhstan — Channel 31
  Malaysia — Astro Prima & Astro Mustika HD
  Thailand — GMM 25

Reception

Ratings

Critical Response

Forevermore largely received positive reviews from viewers. University of the Philippines film professor Ed Cabagnot attributed the program's success to "lightness and the wholesomeness of the love story." He said that "It is a relief from all the other teleserye saturating television prime time revolving around themes of infidelities and family troubles." Former ABS-CBN president and CEO Charo Santos-Concio praised the series for it "acknowledged the goodness of the Filipino as seen through pakikipagkapwa-tao in a community.”

Cultural impact
For the first time in Philippine TV history, the series' principal setting Sitio Pungayan in Mount Cabuyao, Tuba, Benguet, coined as "La Presa", a strawberry farm home to Agnes and Xander, became a tourist phenomenon. The City of Baguio has adopted a resolution commending the show’s contribution in the promotion of the tourism in the city.

According to Resolution Numbered 92, the City of Baguio remarked: “Due to the popularity of the said teleserye, tourists and visitors have been flocking to the City of Baguio to visit and get a glimpse of ‘La Presa’ which has become an instant tourist attraction for the City of Baguio and Tuba, Benguet.”

While the remote place led to growth of businesses with more than 170 roadside stalls set up and became a source of livelihood, the unprecedented influx of fans from across the country, and even abroad, caused traffic congestion and accumulation of garbage in the area. This concern prompted the Supreme Court to issue a Temporary Environmental Protection Order (TEPO) in September 2014. In May 2015, two weeks before the soap ended, the Court of Appeals issued a Writ of Kalikasan and made a Permanent Environmental Protection Order (PEPO). In February 2019, the Department of Environment and Natural Resources in Cordillera Administrative Region reminded the public that the fictional community is still off-limits to visitors.

See also
 List of programs broadcast by ABS-CBN
 List of telenovelas of ABS-CBN

References

External links
 

ABS-CBN drama series
Philippine romantic comedy television series
2014 Philippine television series debuts
2015 Philippine television series endings
Television series by Star Creatives
Filipino-language television shows
Television shows set in Baguio
Television shows set in Manila